Moghan (also Romanized as Moghān and Maghān; also known as Mogham) is a village in Radkan Rural District, in the Central District of Chenaran County, Razavi Khorasan Province, Iran. At the 2006 census, its population was 467, in 111 families.

References 

Populated places in Chenaran County